The Agreement on the Conservation of Populations of European Bats, or EUROBATS, is an international treaty that binds its States Parties on the conservation of bats in their territories. It was signed in 1991 under the auspices of the Convention on the Conservation of Migratory Species of Wild Animals (CMS), with the Agreement entering into force in 1994. In August 2021, the Agreement applied to 38 of 63 range states.

History 
The Agreement was concluded as "Agreement on the Conservation of Bats in Europe" in September 1991 during the Third Meeting of the Parties of the Convention on Migratory Species. It entered into force on 16 January 1994, after the required number of five states (Germany, The Netherlands, Norway, Sweden and UK) had ratified it.

In 2000, the Parties decided to change the Agreement's name into its current form "Agreement on the Conservation of Populations of European Bats". In 2001, the Agreement became part of the United Nations Environment Programme (UNEP).

Aim of the agreement 
The overall goal of the Agreement is to provide a framework for bat conservation for the member states and those that have not yet joined. According to the agreement text, member states prohibit the deliberate capture, keeping or killing of bats except for research purposes for which a special permit is required. Furthermore, the member states identify important sites for bat conservation, survey the status and trends of bat populations and study their migratory patterns. Based on the result of these monitoring activities the Agreement develops and reviews recommendations and guidelines that shall be implemented by the Parties on national levels.

Bodies of the agreement

Meeting of the parties 
The Meeting of the parties is the highest decision-making body of the Agreement and adopts Resolutions. Every Party has one vote. Non-Party range states as well as bat conservation organisations may be represented as observers at the meetings.

The Meeting of the Parties takes place at changing locations every three to four years, most recently in Prague, Czech Republic, 20 – 22 September 2010. (Status: October 2012)

Advisory committee 
The advisory committee is the working body of the agreement. It evaluates data and discusses scientific issues concerning bat research and conservation to set priorities for the Agreement' future work. The committee deals with topics like bat migration, light pollution or the impact of wind turbines on bat populations. Furthermore, it drafts the Resolutions to be adopted at the Meetings of the Parties.

The Committee meets once a year, most recently in Dublin, Ireland, 15–17 May 2012. (Status: October 2012)

Standing committee 
The standing committee is the administrative body of the Agreement. It monitors the execution of the Secretariat's budget, oversees the implementation of policies by the Secretariat and discusses further administrative matters like staff issues. The committee was established by the 5th Meeting of the Parties in autumn 2006 to redesign the Advisory Committee to scientific issues.

The Committee shall meet once a year, if a meeting is needed, at the UN Campus in Bonn/Germany. The first Meeting took place in March 2007, the most recent one in Paris, France, on 28 March 2012. (Status: October 2012)

Secretariat 
The Secretariat is the executive body of the Agreement. It coordinates and organises the activities of the Meeting of the Parties, the Advisory Committee and the Standing Committee and undertakes initiatives for implementing the aspired aims, attracting more member states and exchanging information. Furthermore, it coordinates international research and monitoring activities.

Another main task of the Secretariat is to raise public awareness. The “European Bat Night” goes back to an initiative of the EUROBATS Secretariat and is today an event in more than 30 European states.

The Secretariat was established by the 1st Meeting of the Parties in 1995 and started its work in Bonn/Germany in 1996. Since June 2006 it is accommodated at the UN Campus in the former parliamentary building of the Federal Republic of Germany.

Agreement area 

When it was signed in 1991, the agreement defined the area of the agreement as "the continent of Europe." This ambiguity led to some confusion, and multiple resolutions were passed to try to clarify this matter. A resolution of the 2nd Session of the Meeting of Parties in 1998 defined the area as follows: the Western Palaearctic region, excluding North Africa, Iceland and many of Middle Eastern states in its definition. This definition was reaffirmed in 2006.

However, at the 6th Session of the Meeting of Parties in 2010, Resolution 6.3 defined the scope of the agreement as the Western Palaearctic region. More specifically, it stated that its boundaries were as follow:
 To the North, the Svalbard Archipelago
 To the East, longitude 50° E
 To the South, the countries of the Mediterranean Basin
 To the West, the Azores at 30° West

This new definition recognized that European bats were migrating to and from beyond the previously designated geographical scope of the Agreement as defined in 1998. This new definition included countries in the Middle East and North Africa, the islands owned by European states in the Mediterranean as well as some Central Asian states.

Species 
EUROBATS currently lists 51 species of bat that occur naturally in Europe that the Agreement pertains to. They are as follow:

 Emballonuridae
 Taphozous nudiventris
 Molossidae
 Tadarida teniotis
 Pteropodidae
 Rousettus aegyptiacus
 Rhinolophidae
 Rhinolophus blasii
 Rhinolophus euryale
 Rhinolophus ferrumequinum
 Rhinolophus hipposideros
 Rhinolophus mehelyi
 Vespertilionidae
 Barbastella barbastellus
 Barbastella caspica
 Eptesicus anatolicus
 Eptesicus isabellinus
 Eptesicus nilssonii
 Eptesicus ognevi
 Vespertilionidae (cont.)
 Eptesicus serotinus
 Hypsugo savii
 Myotis alcathoe
 Myotis bechsteinii
 Myotis blythii
 Myotis brandtii
 Myotis capaccinii
 Myotis dasycneme
 Myotis daubentonii
 Myotis davidii
 Myotis emarginatus
 Myotis escalerai
 Myotis myotis
 Myotis mystacinus
 Myotis nattereri
 Myotis punicus
 Myotis schaubi
 Nyctalus azoreum
 Vespertilionidae (cont.)
 Nyctalus lasiopterus
 Nyctalus leisleri
 Nyctalus noctula
 Otonycteris hemprichii
 Pipistrellus hanaki
 Pipistrellus kuhlii
 Pipistrellus maderensis
 Pipistrellus nathusii
 Pipistrellus pipistrellus
 Pipistrellus pygmaeus
 Plecotus auritus
 Plecotus austriacus
 Plecotus kolombatovici
 Plecotus macrobullaris
 Plecotus sardus
 Plecotus teneriffae
 Vespertilio murinus
 Miniopterus pallidus
 Miniopterus schreibersii

Pertaining states

States parties 
The following are all the states that have ratified the Agreement, and are regarded as its member states:

Range states 
The following are all of the states that have territory within the range of the Agreement, but have yet to sign or ratify it:

References

External links
 Agreement Text
 Official Website of EUROBATS
 Parties and range states, interactive map
 Official Website of CMS (Bonn Convention)
 Official Homepage of UNEP

1994 in the environment
Convention on the Conservation of Migratory Species of Wild Animals
Treaties concluded in 1991
Treaties entered into force in 1994
Bat conservation
Treaties of Albania
Treaties of Belgium
Treaties of Bulgaria
Treaties of Croatia
Treaties of Cyprus
Treaties of the Czech Republic
Treaties of Denmark
Treaties of Estonia
Treaties of Finland
Treaties of France
Treaties of Georgia (country)
Treaties of Germany
Treaties of Hungary
Treaties of Ireland
Treaties of Italy
Treaties of Latvia
Treaties of Lithuania
Treaties of Luxembourg
Treaties of North Macedonia
Treaties of Malta
Treaties of Moldova
Treaties of Monaco
Treaties of Montenegro
Treaties of the Netherlands
Treaties of Norway
Treaties of Poland
Treaties of Portugal
Treaties of Romania
Treaties of San Marino
Treaties of Slovakia
Treaties of Slovenia
Treaties of Sweden
Treaties of Switzerland
Treaties of Ukraine
Treaties of the United Kingdom
Treaties extended to Gibraltar
Treaties extended to Guernsey
Treaties extended to the Isle of Man
Treaties extended to Jersey